Likins is a surname. Notable people with the surname include:

 Peter Likins (born 1936), American academic administrator
 Rose M. Likins (born 1959), American diplomat
 Bob Likins (1921–1962), American javelin thrower